Pterostichus atratus is a species of woodland ground beetle in the family Carabidae. It is sometimes considered a species of the genus Abacidus

References

Further reading

 

Pterostichus
Articles created by Qbugbot
Beetles described in 1838